The men's foil competition in fencing at the 2016 Summer Olympics in Rio de Janeiro was held on 7 August at the Carioca Arena 3. The medals were presented by Paul Tergat, IOC member, Kenya and Donald Anthony Jr., Executive Board Member of FIE. There were 35 competitors from 19 nations. The event was won by Daniele Garozzo of Italy, the nation's ninth victory in the men's foil (matching France for most all-time) and first since 1996. The silver medalist was American Alexander Massialas, earning the United States' first medal in the event since 1960. Timur Safin of Russia took bronze.

Background

This was the 27th appearance of the event, which has been held at every Summer Olympics except 1908 (when there was a foil display only rather than a medal event). Five of the eight quarterfinalists from 2012 returned: gold medalist Lei Sheng of China, silver medalist Alaaeldin Abouelkassem of Egypt, fifth-place finisher Andrea Cassarà of Italy, seventh-place finisher Ma Jianfei of China, and eighth-place finisher Aleksey Cheremisinov of Russia. 2008 silver medalist, 2012 top-16 finisher, and reigning world champion Yuki Ota of Japan also returned. Cheremisinov had been world champion in 2014, while American Miles Chamley-Watson had taken the title in 2013. The top-ranked fencer going into the Games was another American, Alexander Massialas.

The Czech Republic made its debut in the men's foil. France and the United States each made their 25th appearance, tied for most of any nation; France had missed only the 1904 (with fencers not traveling to St. Louis) and the 1912 (boycotted due to a dispute over rules) foil competitions, while the United States had missed the inaugural 1896 competition and boycotted the 1980 Games altogether.

Qualification

Nations were limited to three fencers each from 1928 to 2004. However, the 2008 Games introduced a rotation of men's team fencing events with one weapon left off each Games; the individual event without a corresponding team event had the number of fencers per nation reduced to two. Men's foil was the first event this applied to, so each nation could enter a maximum of two fencers in the event in 2008. The team foil was back in 2016 (sabre the missing weapon for men), so the limit was three for 2016.

There were 35 dedicated quota spots for men's foil. The first 24 spots went to the 3 members of each of the 8 qualified teams in the team foil event. Next, 7 more men were selected from the world rankings based on continents: 2 from Europe, 2 from the Americas, 2 from Asia/Oceania, and 1 from Africa. Finally, 4 spots were allocated by continental qualifying events: 1 from Europe, 1 from the Americas, 1 from Asia/Oceania, and 1 from Africa.

Additionally, there were 8 host/invitational spots that could be spread throughout the various fencing events. Brazil had already qualified a men's foil team (with the corresponding three places in individual foil), so used no spots in the individual men's foil.

Competition format

The 1996 tournament had vastly simplified the competition format into a single-elimination bracket, with a bronze medal match. The 2016 tournament continued to use that format. Fencing was done to 15 touches or to the completion of three three-minute rounds if neither fencer reached 15 touches by then. At the end of time, the higher-scoring fencer was the winner; a tie resulted in an additional one-minute sudden-death time period. This sudden-death period was further modified by the selection of a draw-winner beforehand; if neither fencer scored a touch during the minute, the predetermined draw-winner won the bout. Standard foil rules regarding target area, striking, and priority were used.

Schedule 

All times are Brasília Time (UTC-03:00)

Results

Section 1

Section 2

Section 3

Section 4

Finals

Final classification

References

Men's foil
Men's events at the 2016 Summer Olympics